Baby-led potty training is a system for meeting babies' toileting needs. The main feature of the system is that care-givers 'hold babies out' or support them on a potty in order for them to void in an appropriate place outside their nappy. The method is typically started before the baby is six months old. Care-givers use a combination of timing, and observing babies' own signals, to decide when to hold them out.  In many countries it is the norm for parents to care for their babies without nappies from the first days of life.
The term Baby-led potty training describes the method being used by a growing number of families in the UK. It is an adaptation of the techniques used in Africa, India and China amongst others, to fit into a modern Western life-style. It is similar to the US movement Elimination Communication, though UK proponents of the method emphasise its pragmatic approach with no strict rules, and it can be used by any type of parent. Some parents use the technique just occasionally, others as an alternative to full-time nappies, and some as a route to toilet independence.

Benefits 
Parents report benefits in three areas: for baby, parents and the environment. These are some of the main advantages:

For baby:
reduces incidence of nappy rash; more comfortable; encourages communication; helps relieve constipation and wind.

For parents:
cheaper; less washing; more hygienic; fewer leaking nappies; more confidence; greater bond with baby; another tool to soothe a crying baby.

For the environment:
reduces number of soiled and wet nappies sent to landfill; less washing of cloth nappies; solid waste treated via sewerage instead of going to landfill where it releases methane.

Method 
Babies are born with a primitive reflex which causes them to empty their bladder when parents remove the nappy and hold them in a squat position. By holding their baby out regularly, parents capitalise on this reflex. They encourage the baby to go in this position, and soon the baby is conditioned to try to void when in this hold. Parents then offer the baby opportunities to go throughout the day. They can offer based on timing—either at convenient times for the parents, on a routine, or through learning what times the baby is likely to need to pass waste. They can also look out for signs that the baby is uncomfortable with a full bladder or bowel.
Once the baby has become accustomed to passing waste when held or on the potty, parents are able to adapt the method to suit their lifestyle. They can offer the potty just occasionally to help relieve an unsettled baby, or they can offer regularly throughout the day in order to drastically reduce the reliance on nappies.
When continued through to the baby's second year, the method is adapted to help them transition to complete toilet independence.

Historical usage 
The method of holding a baby out to trigger the reflex to urinate and defecate has presumably been used by mothers since the first homo-sapiens. The English doctor Pye Henry Chavasse suggested in his 1839 book "Advice to a Mother on the Management of her Children", that the baby should be held out over a pot at least a dozen times a day at 3 months old; if this were done, there need be no more nappies at 4 months. In 1912 Edward Mansfield Brockbank advised that babies should be supported on the pot from two months old.
The practise was commonplace up until the fifties, when Dr Spock's method of delaying the start of toilet training until 18 months became popular. This, coupled with the advent of disposable nappies meant that the practise of BLPT diminished. Although some mothers still used the method, learning about it either by accident or intuition, or from knowledge passed on by grandparents, the method dropped out of common usage. From the nineties until the present, official UK health advice suggests that it is counter-productive to start toilet training before 18 months, and the standard advice is to wait until children showed signs of "readiness" (but not before 18 – 24 months of age). Amongst some health professionals there is a received wisdom that babies have no bladder or bowel control under two years.

See also 
Elimination communication
Nappies
Open-crotch pants
Toilet training

References 

Toilet training
Babycare